Karsten Braasch and Jens Knippschild were the defending champions but only Braasch competed that year with Thomas Shimada.

Braasch and Shimada lost in the first round to David Adams and Andrew Kratzmann.

Jonas Björkman and Todd Woodbridge won in the final 7–6(8–6), 6–4 against Paul Hanley and Michael Hill.

Seeds

  Jonas Björkman /  Todd Woodbridge (champions)
  Paul Hanley /  Michael Hill (final)
  David Adams /  Andrew Kratzmann (semifinals)
  Lucas Arnold /  Guillermo Cañas (semifinals)

Draw

External links
 2002 Swedish Open Doubles Draw

Men's Doubles
Doubles